Zhijin Cave is a karst cave located in Minzhai Village, Zhijin County, Guizhou Province, People's Republic of China.

Description
Originally called the Daji Cave, it was discovered in 1980 by the Zhijin County Tourism Resources Exploration Team.

The surrounding area, known as the Guizhou Zhijin Cave Scenic Area, was made a national level tourist site by the Chinese State Council in 1988.

Gallery

See also
 List of UNESCO Global Geoparks in Asia

External links

References

Caves of Guizhou
Karst caves
Karst formations of China
Tourist attractions in Guizhou